Dorstenia erythranda is a plant species in the family Moraceae which is native to Cuba and Hispaniola.

References

erythranda
Plants described in 1866
Flora of Cuba
Flora of the Dominican Republic
Flora of Haiti
Flora without expected TNC conservation status